Epichorista aethocoma is a species of moth of the family Tortricidae. It is found in Angola.

References

Endemic fauna of Angola
Moths described in 1923
Epichorista